Sericosura is a genus of sea spiders in the family Ammotheidae. Species within this genus have been found living at depths from 106 to 3,690 meters below sea level.

Species

 Sericosura bamberi Arango & Linse, 2015
 Sericosura cochleifovea Child, 1989
 Sericosura conta Bamber, 2009
 Sericosura curva Arango & Linse, 2015
 Sericosura cyrtoma Child & Segonzac, 1996
 Sericosura dentatus Wang, Lin, Bamber & Huang, 2013
 Sericosura dimorpha Arango & Linse, 2015
 Sericosura dissita Child, 2000
 Sericosura gemmaemonsis Wang, Lin, Bamber & Huang, 2013
 Sericosura hedgpethi Bamber, 2009
 Sericosura heteroscela Child & Segonzac, 1996
 Sericosura mitrata (Gordon, 1944)
 Sericosura venticola Child, 1987
 Sericosura verenae (Child, 1987)

References

Pycnogonids